The 1980 Amstel Gold Race was the 15th edition of the annual road bicycle race "Amstel Gold Race", held on Sunday April 5, 1980, in the Dutch province of Limburg. The race stretched 238 kilometres, with the start in Heerlen and the finish in Meerssen. There were a total of 146 competitors, and 66 cyclists finished the race.

Result

External links
 Results
 
 

Amstel Gold Race
April 1980 sports events in Europe
1980 in road cycling
1980 in Dutch sport
1980 Super Prestige Pernod